This is a list of notable artists who have recorded for Elektra Records or any of its subsidiary labels, former or otherwise. 



0-9
 1000 Clowns
 10,000 Maniacs

A
 AC/DC (East West America/Elektra) (outside Australia and New Zealand)
 David Ackles
 Yolanda Adams
 The Adventures
 The Afghan Whigs
 Dean Alexander
 Karen Alexander
 Aimee Allen
 The Amps
 Jon Anderson
 AMM
 Aneka
 Anthrax
 Aphex Twin (Sire/Elektra)
 Ars Nova
 Atomic Rooster
 Audience
 Austin Mahone
 The Avalanches (US/Canada)
 Avril Lavigne
 Aztec Two-Step

B
 Badfinger
 Bad Company
 Anita Baker
 Bamboo
 The Band Camino
 The Bangles
 Beats International
 The Beautiful South
 The Beefeaters
 Bel Canto (Dali/Chameleon/Elektra)
 The Bellamy Brothers (Curb/Elektra)
 Alec Benjamin
 Benzino
 Better Than Ezra
 The Big F
 Big Smo
 Theodore Bikel
 The Black Dog (East West America/Elektra)
 Blindside
 Björk (US/Canada)
 Ruben Blades
Curt Boettcher
 Karla Bonoff
 Billy Bragg
 Billy Lawrence (East West America/Elektra)
 Brand New Immortals
 Brand Nubian
 Bread
 The Breeders
 Jackson Browne (Asylum/Elektra)
 Brynn Cartelli 
 Peabo Bryson
 Lindsey Buckingham (US/Canada)
 Lord Buckley
 Tim Buckley
 Burn Season
 Butterfield Blues Band
 Donald Byrd

C
 Cafuné
 Hamilton Camp
 The Call
 Brandi Carlile
 The Cars
 Harry Chapin
 Tracy Chapman
 Torrey Carter (The Gold Mind/East West America/Elektra)
 Jackie Chan 
 Desmond Child
 Chubb Rock (Select/Elektra)
 Stanley Clarke
 Clear Light
 Clipse (East West America/Elektra)
 Brent Cobb
 Natalie Cole
 Judy Collins
 Josie Cotton
 Crabby Appleton
 The Cure (US/Canada)
 Cold Chisel
 Chloe Moriondo
 Christina Perri

D
 Dadawa (Sire/Elektra)
 Dakota Moon
 Damageplan
Alana Davis
 David Peel
 Deadsy
 Deee-Lite
 Devo
 Del tha Funkee Homosapien
 Delaney & Bonnie
 Destiny's Child
 Digable Planets (Pendulum/Elektra)
 The Dillards
 Dokken
 The Doors
 Down
 Dream Theater

E
 Eagles (Asylum/Elektra)
 Ernie Earnshaw
 Elia Alberghini
 Earth Opera
 Anderson East
 Ebn Ozn
 Eclection
 Terry Ellis (East West America/Elektra)
 Missy Elliott (The Gold Mind/East West America/Elektra)
 Entouch
En Vogue (East West America/Elektra)
 Epidemic
 Episode Six
 Erasure (Mute/Elektra) (US/Canada/Mexico)
 Espionage
 Ethyl Meatplow (Chameleon/Elektra)

F
 Fabolous
 Faith
 Fally Ipupa
 The Family Stand
 The Farm (All In/New Revolution/Elektra)
 Faster Pussycat
 Fay Ray
 The Fearless Four
 Feeder (North America)
 Finish Ticket
 Fishbone (Hollywood/Elektra)
 Fitz and the Tantrums
 Flipmode Squad
 Jason Falkner
 Lisa Fischer
 Lita Ford
 The Format
Glenn Frey
 David Frye
 Fun.

G
 Charlotte Gainsbourg (US)
 David Gates
 Crystal Gayle
 The Georgia Satellites
 Jimmie Dale Gilmore
 Gipsy Kings (Elektra Musician)
 Goodie Mob
 GoodThunder
 Vern Gosdin
 Goudie
Grandson
 CeeLo Green
 Nanci Griffith
 Grandmaster Flash
 Grand Puba
 Gulliver

H
 Handsome Boy Modeling School
 Happy Mondays (Factory/Elektra)
 Emmylou Harris
 Roy Head
 Howard Hewett
 Sara Hickman
 Nick Hoffman
 Hoodoo Gurus
 Adina Howard (Mecca Don/East West America/Elektra)
 Howard Jones
 The Highwomen
 The Housemartins

I
 Imagination
 Incredible String Band
 INI

J
 Colin James
 Etta James
Jet (outside Australia/New Zealand)
 Jobriath
 Freedy Johnston
 Howard Jones (US)
 Junior Prom
 Justice
jxdn

K
 Kaleo
 Kane & Abel (Most Wanted/Elektra)
 Kieran Kane
 Ben E. King
 Kid 'N Play (Select/Elektra)
 Greg Kihn  (Beserkley/Elektra)
 KMD
 Korgis
 Korn (Roadrunner/Elektra)
Koerner, Ray & Glover
 K.P. & Envyi (East West America/Elektra)
 Kraftwerk (US)
 Jana Kramer
 Kut Klose (Keia/Elektra)
 Kyuss

L
 Paul Laine
 Avril Lavigne
 Debra Laws
 Leaders of the New School
 Gerald Levert (East West America/Elektra)
 Lucky Boys Confusion
 Ryan Lewis
 Huey Lewis and the News
 Lil Mo (The Goldmind/East West America/Elektra)
 The Limelighters
 Lindisfarne (US)
 Little Boots
 Livingston
 Lord Have Mercy
 Lords of the Underground (Pendulum/Elektra)
 Love
 LSG (East West America/Elektra)
 Lucky Boys Confusion
 Loona
 Luna
 Jerry Lee Lewis

M
 Macklemore
 Marques Houston
 Macklemore & Ryan Lewis
 Man Parrish
 Bruno Mars
 Billie Ray Martin (Sire/Elektra)
 Eric Martin Band (Asylum/Elektra)
 Ziggy Marley
 Marina (679/Elektra) (US)
 Angie Martinez
 Marvelous 3
Masked Wolf
 MC5
 MC Lyte (First Priority Music/Elektra)
 Mint Condition
 Lila McCann
 Ed McCurdy
 Bobby McFerrin (Elektra Musician)
 Sérgio Mendes
 Natalie Merchant
 Freddie Mercury (Hollywood/Elektra) (US)
 Metal Church
 Metallica (US/Canada)
 Mindless Self Indulgence
 Mista
 Joni Mitchell
 Moby (Mute/Elektra) (US/Canada)
 Moonpools & Caterpillars
 Laza Morgan
 The Moth & The Flame
 The Mothers
 Mötley Crüe
 Motograter
 Jason Mraz
 Shirley Murdock
 Masked Wolf

N
 New Rules (band)
 Nada Surf
 Nate Dogg
 NEEDTOBREATHE
 Fred Neil
 Mark Nesler
 The New Seekers
 Nico

O
 Phil Ochs
 The Odds
 Ol' Dirty Bastard
 Old 97's
 Roy Orbison
 Organized Konfusion (Hollywood BASIC/Elektra)
 Orleans (Asylum)
 K.T. Oslin
 Tommy Overstreet

P
 Paramore (Fueled By Ramen/Elektra)
 Pantera (East West America/Elektra)
 Stella Parton
 The Party (Hollywood/Elektra) (US/Canada)
 Tom Paxton
 Teddy Pendergrass
 Pete Rock & CL Smooth
 Phish
 PinkPantheress (Parlophone)
 Pixies (4AD/Elektra) (US)
 The Pandoras
 The Pogues
Prateek Kuhad
 The Prodigy
 Public Image Ltd. (US/Canada)
 The Plimsouls
 Plainsong

Q
 Queen (US/Canada/Japan/Australia/New Zealand)

R
 Eddie Rabbitt
 Trevor Rabin
 Rah Digga
 Rainbow Kitten Surprise
 Rampage the Last Boy Scout
 Raw Fusion (Hollywood BASIC/Elektra)
 Ray J (East West America/Elektra)
 Leon Redbone
 Renaissance (US/Canada)
 Reveille
 Rhinoceros
 Charlie Rich
 Zachary Richard
 Jean Ritchie
 Lee Ritenour
 Hargus "Pig" Robbins
 Linda Ronstadt
 Dick Rosmini
 Mark Ronson
 Rogue Male
 The Rubinoos
 Tom Rush
 Patrice Rushen

S
 Savannah Conley
 Sabicas
 Neil Sedaka
 Sacario
 Masashi Sada
 Saint Motel
 Saint Raymond
 David Sanborn
 Scrawl
 The Screaming Blue Messiahs
 Bob Segarini
 Serafin (US/Canada/Mexico)
 Peter Schilling (US)
 Kevin Sharp
 Ed Sheeran (Asylum/Elektra) (US) 
 Karen Clark Sheard
 Shoes
 Paul Siebel
Semisonic
 Shinehead
 The Shoes
 Silk (Keia/Elektra)
 Simply Red (US)
 Carly Simon
 Nina Simone
 The Sisters of Mercy
 Smashed Gladys
 Phoebe Snow
 Socialburn
 Sonia Dada (Chameleon/Elektra)
 Spacehog (Sire/Elektra)
 Sparks
 Mark Spoelstra
 Spoon
 Staind
 Stalk Forrest Group
 Starpoint
 Steel Pulse
 Stereolab
 Dani Stevenson
 Dave Stewart
 The Stooges
 The Sugarcubes (US/Canada)
 Joe Sun
 Superdrag
 Sturgill Simpson
 Keith Sweat
 Sweetwater
 Sworn Enemy
 Systematic
 SF9 (band) (FNC Entertainment/Elektra)

T
 Tamia
 Tangerine Dream (US)
 Roger Taylor (US/Canada/Japan/Australia/New Zealand)
 Towa Tei
 Television
 3rd Storee (Yab-Yum/East West America/Elektra)
 Judy Tenuta
 They Might Be Giants
 Third Eye Blind
 Billy Thorpe
 Gina Thompson (The Gold Mind/East West America/Elektra)
 Thrasher Shiver
 Thrush Hermit
 Mel Tillis
 Tones and I (outside Australia/New Zealand)
 Joe Lynn Turner
 Tweet (The Gold Mind/Elektra)
 Conway Twitty
 Twenty One Pilots

U
 Uffie
 The Unforgiven
 Gary Usher
 Utopia (Network/Elektra) (US/Canada)

V
 Dino Valenti
 VAST
 Violent Femmes
 Vonray
 Vitamin C

W
 The Wackers
 Tom Waits
 Chris Walker (Pendulum/Elektra)
 Grover Washington Jr.
 Sadao Watanabe
 Ween
 Josh White
 Womack & Womack
 Nicole Wray (The Gold Mind/East West America/Elektra)
 Hank Williams Jr. (Curb/Elektra)
 White Reaper
 White Trash
 Angela Winbush
 Lucinda Williams (Chameleon/Elektra)
 Charlie Wilson

X
 X

Y
 Year of the Rabbit
 Yello
 Yes (Rhino/Elektra)
 Yo-Yo (East West America/Elektra)
 Young the Giant
 Yngwie J. Malmsteen

Z
 Warren Zevon (Asylum/Elektra)
 Bailey Zimmerman (Warner Nashville/Elektra)
 John Zorn (Elektra Musician)
 Zero 7 (US Only)

References

Elektra